Giuseppe Salvioli (born 5 November 1917) was an Italian professional football player.

Salvioli played one game in the 1942/43 Serie A for A.S. Roma.

References

1917 births
Possibly living people
Italian footballers
Serie A players
A.C. Perugia Calcio players
A.S. Roma players
U.S. Lecce players
A.C. Reggiana 1919 players
U.S. Avellino 1912 players
Sportspeople from Modena
Association football midfielders
Footballers from Emilia-Romagna